Puerto Rico Highway 171 (PR-171) is a road that travels from Cidra, Puerto Rico to Cayey. It begins at its intersection with PR-172 in downtown Cidra and ends at its junction with PR-14 near downtown Cayey.

Major intersections

See also

 List of highways numbered 171

References

External links
 

171